The John Murphy Award for Excellence in Copy Editing is given annually by the Texas Daily Newspaper Association (TDNA). Consideration is given only to submissions by Texas daily newspapers that are members of TDNA.

The award alternates every year between papers with circulations of less than 100,000 and those with more than 100,000. The winner receives $1,000. Four people have earned the award twice: Carmelita Bevill in 1987 and 1992, Hank Glamann in 1990 and 1994, Dave Thomas in 1995 and 1997 and Vic Odegar in 2003 and 2005.

The award honors John Murphy, who served as executive vice president of TDNA from 1952 to 1985. Murphy died in 2007.

Winners
2008—Stephanie Milner, Houston Chronicle
2007—Matt Dulin, Beaumont Enterprise
2006—Daniel Purschwitz, Fort Worth Star-Telegram
2005—Vic Odegar, Beaumont Enterprise
2004—Chris Borniger, The Dallas Morning News
2003—Vic Odegar, Beaumont Enterprise
2002 -- Scott Mitchell, Fort Worth Star-Telegram
2001—Summer Blackwell, San Angelo Standard-Times
2000—Tim Sager, Fort Worth Star-Telegram
1999—Melani Angell, San Angelo Standard-Times
1998—Karen Patterson, The Dallas Morning News
1997—Dave Thomas, Beaumont Enterprise
1996—Paul A. McGrath, Houston Chronicle
1995—Dave Thomas, San Angelo Standard-Times
1994—Hank Glamann, Houston Chronicle
1993—Diane Bowen, Bryan-College Station Eagle
1992—Carmelita Bevill, Fort Worth Star-Telegram
1991—Scott Walker, Bryan-College Station Eagle
1990—Hank Glamann, Houston Chronicle
1989—Beth Copeland, Corpus Christi Caller-Times
1988—Anthony Shuga, Austin American-Statesman
1987—Carmelita Bevill, Bryan-College Station Eagle

External links
 Official website

Copy editing
American journalism awards